Caminandes is an independently produced series of computer animated short films created by Pablo Vazquez (was born in Río Gallegos, Santa Cruz Province, Argentina), produced and released by the Blender Foundation.

Etymology 
The title "Caminandes" is a portmanteau of the Spanish word "caminar" ("to walk") and Andes, the longest continental mountain range in the world. The subtitles of episodes 2 and 3 are also portmanteaus of various Spanish words.

Plot 
The films center on Koro the llama and his attempts to overcome various obstacles in Patagonia.

 Caminandes 1: Llama Drama (2013)
Koro has trouble crossing an apparent desolate road, a problem that an unwitting Armadillo does not share.

 Caminandes 2: Gran Dillama (2013)
Koro hunts for food on the other side of a fence and is once again inspired by the Armadillo but this time to a shocking effect.

 Caminandes 3: Llamigos (2016)
Koro meets Oti, a pesky magellanic penguin, in an epic battle over tasty red berries during the winter.

Production 

The films, inspired by the cartoons of Chuck Jones, are created using FLOSS (Free/Libre Open Source Software) such as
 Blender, a professional free and open-source 3D computer graphics software
 GIMP, a free and open-source raster graphics editor
 Krita, a free and open-source raster graphics editor based on Qt 5 and the KDE Frameworks 5
 Linux, a Unix-like computer operating system assembled under the model of free and open-source software development and distribution

The first film was produced by Pablo Vazquez, Beorn Leonard and Francesco Siddi with a soundtrack by Jan Morgenstern. Hjalti Hjalmarsson, Andy Goralczyk and Sergey Sharybin joined the production team for the second film.

Awards 
Jan Morgenstern won the 2014 Jerry Goldsmith award for "Best Score for an Animated Short Film" at the International Film Music Festival in Córdoba, Spain, for Gran Dillama.

Gallery

References

External links 

 

 
 
 

Blender Foundation
Computer-animated short films
Creative Commons-licensed films
Open content short films
Articles containing video clips
Animated films about llamas